The 1964–65 SK Rapid Wien season was the 67th season in club history.

Squad

Squad and statistics

Squad statistics

Fixtures and results

League

Cup

European Cup

Mitropa Cup

References

1964-65 Rapid Wien Season
Rapid